Yannis Menelaos Ioannides (born 1945 in Kyparissia, Greece) is a Greek-American economist, who received his Ph.D. from Stanford University, 1974. Having studied electrical engineering as an undergraduate at the National Technical University, Athens, Greece, he pursued graduate studies at Stanford, where he was advised by Robert C. Lind, James L. Sweeney and Hayne E. Leland.  He joined the Tufts University faculty in September 1995 as the Max and Herta Neubauer Chair and Professor in Economics. Previously he taught at the University of California (Riverside), Brown University, Boston University, and Virginia Polytechnic Institute and State University, where he also served as Department Head from 1989-1995. He held an appointment as a professor of economics at the Athens School of Economics and Business, Athens, Greece, 1983–1986, and was a research associate at the National Bureau of Economic Research from 1982-1993.

Ioannides, an applied theorist and empirical economist, became known for his contributions to the economics of housing markets, starting with his doctoral dissertation on equilibrium search in housing markets (which was motivated by the "Phelps Volume") and on with in-depth analyses of numerous housing market issues,  their interactions with labor markets and their role within the urban economy more generally as well as the international economy. He has sought to clarify how housing serves both households’ needs for consumption as well as for diversification of asset holdings during the life cycle. He has devoted to housing markets research, theoretical and applied, more than one-fourth of his total research output of more than one hundred research articles as of 2015. He has also written on various aspects of labor markets and household decisions in dynamic settings, as well as other several topics that provide input to modern macroeconomics and adopted tools of macroeconomics for use in urban, regional, social and labor economics.

His most recent interests combine social economics and macroeconomics (with special emphasis on social interactions), the volution of trading structures, economic growth and inequality, social interactions and networks, and housing markets.  His book, From Neighborhoods to Nations: The Economics of Social Interactions, Princeton University Press, 2013, aims at synthesizing the literature on neighborhood effects and social interactions into a theory of the spatial structure of modern economies. He has a side interest in Modern Greek Studies,  co-chaired the Greek Study Group, Minda de Gunzburg Center for European Studies, Harvard University, 2004-2014. After the onset of the crisis that has engulfed Greece since 2009 he has lectured in public forums as well as written extensively in the Greek and international press (as well as formally) on numerous aspects of the crisis.

References

External links
 
 

1945 births
Living people
20th-century Greek economists
Stanford University alumni
Tufts University faculty
21st-century Greek economists
People from Kyparissia